In mathematics, Cohn's theorem states that a nth-degree self-inversive polynomial   has as many roots in the open unit disk  as the reciprocal polynomial of its derivative. Cohn's theorem is useful for studying the distribution of the roots of self-inversive and self-reciprocal polynomials in the complex plane.

An nth-degree polynomial,

 

is called self-inversive if there exists a fixed complex number of modulus 1 so that,

 

where

 

Self-inversive polynomials have many interesting properties. For instance, its roots are all symmetric with respect to the unit circle and a polynomial whose roots are all on the unit circle is necessarily self-inversive. The coefficients of self-inversive polynomials satisfy the relations.

 

In the case where     a self-inversive polynomial becomes a complex-reciprocal polynomial (also known as a self-conjugate polynomial).  If its coefficients are real then it becomes a real self-reciprocal polynomial.

 

Therefore, Cohn's theorem states that both  and the polynomial

 

have the same number of roots in

References

Theorems about polynomials